The Secrets of Isis, originally broadcast as Isis, is an American live-action superhero television series produced by Filmation from 1975 to 1976 for CBS's Saturday morning lineup. The series was renamed The Secrets of Isis in syndication.

The program was the first weekly American live-action television series with a female superhero lead character, debuting on September 6, 1975, predating the weekly debuts of both The Bionic Woman (January 14, 1976) and Wonder Woman (April 21, 1976). In the series, Isis (Joanna Cameron) is the alter ego of Andrea Thomas, a seemingly normal schoolteacher, who transforms into the Egyptian goddess when presented with crises a mere mortal cannot resolve.

Episodes of the series featured crossovers featuring Captain Marvel from the companion series, Shazam!. Likewise, Joanna Cameron appeared as Isis on Shazam! in return; since then DC Comics has adopted the character of Isis into their mainstream continuity for modern comics.

Premise 

Isis starred Joanna Cameron as Andrea Thomas, a science teacher at Larkspur High School who found an ancient mystical gold amulet, the "Tutmose amulet", on an archeological dig in Egypt. The Isiac amulet, which resembled the headdress of Hathor, had originally belonged to Queen Hatshepsut, an Ancient Egyptian pharaoh. The amulet gave the wearer (specifically, Hatshepsut and her descendants, of which Andrea was one) "the powers of the animals and the elements", which would be bestowed upon such wearer by the goddess Isis whenever it was exposed and her name invoked. Whenever Isis was needed, Andrea would reveal the Isiac amulet (which she wore as an everyday necklace) and recite an incantation—"Oh mighty Isis"—transforming her into the goddess/super-heroine.

The series co-starred Brian Cutler as fellow teacher Rick Mason who acted as Andrea's potential love interest, Joanna Pang as student Cindy Lee, and Albert Reed as Dr. Barnes, the school principal. In Season 2, Ronalda Douglas joined the cast as Rennie Carol, replacing the Cindy character. Guest stars on the show included Mike Lookinland, Debralee Scott, Leigh McCloskey, Phil Bruns, Mark Lambert, Steven Paul, Thomas Carter, Colleen Camp, Johnny Doran, William Engesser, Laurette Spang, Tommy Norden, Victor Sen Yung, Russ Marin and Christopher Norris.

Three episodes of the series featured crossover appearances by Captain Marvel (of the show's companion series, Shazam!). Likewise, Joanna Cameron appeared as Isis in three episodes of Shazam!

Most of the program's storylines involved Isis coming to the rescue of high school students who found themselves in danger due to unwise choices. A notable exception was the two-part series finale, "Now You See It...", and, "...Now You Don't", which had an espionage-related plotline revealing that Rick Mason has been working secretly for the U.S. government on a weather-making machine. This two-parter introduced a trio of crime-fighting teens dubbed "The Super-Sleuths"; the double episode was intended as a backdoor pilot for a Super-Sleuths series, which never materialized.

The Secrets of Isis often "broke the fourth wall", with Isis/Andrea winking at the camera or otherwise acknowledging the audience at pertinent moments in a story. In signature Filmation fashion, each episode featured an epilogue with Isis directly addressing the camera and imparting a moral lesson derived from the preceding events of that episode. These moral-message segments were later deleted from syndication prints.

Powers and abilities 
Isis displays a vast array of superpowers, usually invoked through incantation of a rhyming couplet. For example, Isis can take flight by reciting "O zephyr winds which blow on high / Lift me now so I can fly". Among her many powers, she exhibits superhuman strength, command of the elements (earth, air, fire, and water), and control of the weather. She can control the molecular density of her body and other matter, passing herself through walls, and in one instance, causing a car to pass unharmed through a road grader. She can divine the recent past, which is manifested for the viewer in the jewel of her diadem. Isis can cause living things, including trees and animals, to appear and disappear at will. She can increase local gravity, and stop and reverse the flow of time.

Isis's superhuman abilities are limited when in her Andrea Thomas form. She is still able to communicate telepathically with her pet crow, Tut, and in one instance, the reflection of light off her amulet restored a forgotten memory to a person.

Episodes

Season 1 (1975)

Season 2 (1976)

Chronological list of crossover episodes with Shazam! 
 Shazam!, Season 2: "The Odd Couple" (Oct. 18, 1975)
 The Secrets of Isis, Season 1: "Funny Gal" (Nov. 22, 1975)
 Shazam!, Season 3: "Finders Keepers" (Oct. 2, 1976)
 Shazam!, Season 3: "Out of Focus" (Oct. 16, 1976)
 The Secrets of Isis, Season 2: "Now You See It ..." (Oct. 23, 1976)
 The Secrets of Isis, Season 2: "... Now You Don't" (Oct. 30, 1976)

Broadcast history 
Twenty-two episodes of Isis aired as part of The Shazam/Isis Hour on CBS from September 6, 1975, to October 23, 1976, with 15 episodes in the first season and seven in the second. The success of the show led to CBS returning and rerunning of the series starting in October 1977 for the 1977-1978 season as The Secrets of Isis (replacement for a failed series). The character also appeared in three episodes of Shazam!.

Home media 
On July 24, 2007, American DVD distributor BCI Eclipse (under its Ink & Paint classic animation entertainment label) (under license from Entertainment Rights, then owners of the Filmation catalog) released The Secrets of Isis: The Complete Series as a 3-disc DVD box set in North America. The episodes were presented uncut, re-mastered and in their "known original airdate order", with extant copies of the "moral-message" segments cut for syndication presented as bonus features. The DVD includes the first issue of The Legend of Isis, a comic book published by Bluewater Productions, that debuted in 2007.

In September 2011, Classic Media released the first seven episodes as a one-disc set titled The Secrets of Isis.

Savor Ediciones, S.A. released El Secreto: La Serie Completa as a 4-disc Region 2 DVD box set on July 15, 2009. Unlike the BCI set, this release only contains the episodes, no bonus features (not even the extant morals). Being a Region 2 release for Spain, the soundtrack is the dubbed Spanish version. The original English soundtrack was not included, even as a secondary option. The discs are encoded in the PAL video format, which is the same format as the currently-existing masters, so there is a small amount of additional picture area not present on the NTSC conversions released by BCI Eclipse.

Other appearances 
Isis later appeared in animated form (voiced by Diane Pershing) on the Freedom Force segment of Filmation's Tarzan and the Super 7 show in 1980. The animated Isis also made a guest appearance on the Filmation cartoon Hero High in 1981 (voiced by Linda Gary).

Despite sharing a program block with Shazam! and appearing in 1970s DC Comics publications, Isis was an original Filmation property. The rights to the character are today controlled by Universal Television, which owns the rights to most of the Filmation catalog and characters. A considerably reworked comic-book version of the character, still connected with Captain Marvel and given the alter-ego "Adrianna Tomaz" in honor of the television character, was introduced in the 2006 DC weekly maxi-series 52. This version of Isis becomes the wife of Captain Marvel's nemesis Black Adam, attempting to reform him before her death and resurrection later drive both Adam and Isis into villainy.

Grammnet, actor/producer Kelsey Grammer's production company, has reportedly obtained the rights to produce a movie based on the character, to be called The Legend of Isis.

Isis appeared in the season 10 episode "Isis" of the CW Network's Superman-based drama series, Smallville. Portrayed by Smallville actress Erica Durance, this version saw the amulet take over the body of Lois Lane. However, there were nods to The Shazam!/Isis Hour and the modern character in Durance's portrayal.

The character of Zari Tomaz on The CW series Legends of Tomorrow, is inspired by the TV and comic versions of Isis, using a mystic amulet for her powers.

References

External links 
 
 Toonopedia on Isis

CBS original programming
1970s American children's television series
1970s American science fiction television series
American superhero television series
Captain Marvel (DC Comics) in other media
American children's science fiction television series
American children's adventure television series
Television shows based on DC Comics
DC Comics television series by Filmation
1975 American television series debuts
1977 American television series endings
Superheroine television shows
Television series by Warner Bros. Television Studios
Isis
American children's action television series
American children's fantasy television series
Television series based on Egyptian mythology
Television shows adapted into comics
Cultural depictions of Hatshepsut
Publicity stunts in fiction